Quang Nam Football Club, simply known as Quang Nam, is a professional football club, based in Tam Ky, Quang Nam province, Vietnam. They are now playing in V.League 2. The club was formerly known as QNK Quang Nam.

The team is currently playing at Tam Ky Stadium.

Achievements

National competitions
League
V.League 1:
 Winners : 2017
V.League 2:
 Winners : 2013
Second League:
 Winners : 2003, 2008
Cup
 Vietnamese Super Cup:
 Winners :   2017
 Vietnamese Cup:
 Runners-Up :  2019

Players

First-team squad
As of 18 August 2022.

Out on loan

Former notable players

  Claudecir
  Đinh Thanh Trung
  Hồ Văn Thuận
  Hoàng Vissai
  Hoàng Vũ Samson
  Huỳnh Tấn Sinh
  Lê Phước Tứ
  Nguyễn Huy Hùng
  Nguyễn Trung Đại Dương
  Phạm Văn Cường
  Trường An

Season-by-season record

Kit manufacturers and shirt sponsors

Reserves team

References

External links
Official website (archived 13 August 2009)

Football clubs in Vietnam
1997 establishments in Vietnam
Association football clubs established in 1997